Mörön Airport  is a public airport located in Mörön, the capital of Khövsgöl Province, Mongolia.

Airlines and destinations

See also 
List of airports in Mongolia
Gelenkhüü

References

External links 

World airports: Mörön

Airports in Mongolia
Khövsgöl Province